A gubernatorial election was held on 8 April 2007 to elect the Governor of Hokkaido Prefecture.

Candidates
Harumi Takahashi - incumbent governor of Hokkaido, age 53.
Satoshi Arai - member of the House of Representatives, age 60.
 - full-time member of the Communist Party's Hokkaido Committee, age 43.

Results

References

Hokkaido gubernational elections
2007 elections in Japan